Kirsi Välimaa-Antila (born 15 October 1978 in Jämijärvi, Satakunta) is a Finnish cross-country skier who competed from 1999 to 2008. Her lone World Cup victory was in a 4 × 5 km relay event in Sweden in 2005.

At the 2006 Winter Olympics in Turin, Välimaa-Antila finished 34th in the 7.5 km + 7.5 km double pursuit event. Her best finish at the FIS Nordic World Ski Championships was fifth in the 4 × 5 km relay at Oberstdorf in 2005.

Cross-country skiing results
All results are sourced from the International Ski Federation (FIS).

Olympic Games

World Championships

World Cup

Season standings

Individual podiums
2 podiums

Team podiums
1 victory
8 podiums

References

External links

1978 births
Living people
People from Jämijärvi
Cross-country skiers at the 2006 Winter Olympics
Finnish female cross-country skiers
Olympic cross-country skiers of Finland
Sportspeople from Satakunta
21st-century Finnish women